Epione repandaria, the bordered beauty, is a moth of the family Geometridae.

The species can be found in the Palearctic realm from western Europe, to Scandinavia in the north, the Mediterranean in the south, and east to the Caucasus, Russia and Russian Far East, Siberia, and Amur.

The wingspan is 25–30 mm. The length of the forewings is 13–16 mm. The forewing ground colour is yellow with flecks of orange. The wing veins are also orange. The fascia are black-brown. The basal fascia forms a midpoint right angle. The distal fascia ends apically. The distal area is shaded grey and there is a small black discal spot. The hindwing is similar but lacks the basal fascia and the distal fascia does not reach the wing apex.

The moths fly in one generation from July to September. . They are attracted to light.

The caterpillars feed on sallow.

Notes
The flight season refers to the British Isles. This may vary in other parts of the range.

External links

Bordered beauty on UKmoths
BioLib
Lepidoptera of Belgium
Lepiforum.de
Vlindernet.nl 

Ourapterygini
Moths described in 1767
Moths of Asia
Moths of Europe
Taxa named by Johann Siegfried Hufnagel